Emmanuel W Tupele-Ebi Diffa was elected Senator for the Bayelsa West constituency of Bayelsa State, Nigeria at the start of the Nigerian Fourth Republic, running on the Alliance for Democracy (AD) platform. He took office on 29 May 1999.
 
After taking his seat in the Senate in June 1999 he was appointed to committees on Petroleum, Environment, Niger Delta and Social Development & Sports.
He was appointed deputy whip for the AD in the Senate.
In December 2002 there were rumors that Diffa was planning to seek reelection on the People's Democratic Party (PDP) platform, without first formally leaving the AD.

References

Members of the Senate (Nigeria)
Living people
People from Bayelsa State
Alliance for Democracy (Nigeria) politicians
20th-century Nigerian politicians
21st-century Nigerian politicians
Year of birth missing (living people)